The hangerok (sometimes spelled hangerock or hangeroc) was a type of dress worn by Viking women and some other early medieval northern European cultures. The garment was shaped somewhat like a pinafore, with two straps over the shoulders secured by brooches. It would usually be worn over a tunic-dress called a særk or a kirtle (underdress).

Etymology

The word originates from German or Germanic Hängerock. Rock means skirt or (historically) dress in German, while hänger refers to the hanging of items from the brooches.

See also
Sarafan

References

Dresses
Early Germanic clothing
Women in early Germanic culture